The Wounded Man is a 1983 French film directed by Patrice Chéreau, and written by him and Hervé Guibert. It stars Jean-Hugues Anglade and Vittorio Mezzogiorno. It won the César Award for Best Writing, and was entered in the 1983 Cannes Film Festival.

Cast
 Jean-Hugues Anglade - Henri
 Vittorio Mezzogiorno - Jean Lerman
 Roland Bertin - Bosmans
 Lisa Kreuzer - Elisabeth
 Claude Berri - The client
 Armin Mueller-Stahl - The father
 Annick Alane - The mother
 Sophie Edmond - The sister
 Hammou Graïa - The station man
 Gérard Desarthe - The man who cries
 Denis Lavant
 Maria Verdi
 Suzanne Chavance
 Roland Chalosse
 Eddy Roos
 Charly Chemouny

References

External links 
 
 

1983 films
1980s French-language films
French LGBT-related films
1983 drama films
Films directed by Patrice Chéreau
1983 LGBT-related films
LGBT-related drama films
Films produced by Claude Berri
French drama films
Films scored by Fiorenzo Carpi
1980s French films